Timothy Ivan Melson (born January 1, 1960) is an American physician and politician. A Republican, he has served as a member of the Alabama State Senate from the 1st District since 2015. He serves on the following eight committees: Agriculture Conservation and Forestry, Constitution Ethics and Elections, County and Municipal Government, Finance and Taxation General Fund, Health and Human Services, Local Legislation Madison County, Fiscal Responsibility and Economic Development, and Tourism & Marketing.

In 2021, he introduced a successful bill to legalize medical cannabis in Alabama.

References

External links
 Biography at Alabama Legislature
 Political profile at Bama Politics

Living people
Republican Party Alabama state senators
21st-century American politicians
University of North Alabama alumni
University of Alabama School of Medicine alumni
Physicians from Alabama
1960 births